The Burghersdorp Gazette was a newspaper that operated from Burghersdorp in the Cape Colony, for a brief period from 1872 to 1873.

References

Defunct newspapers published in South Africa
Publications established in 1872
Publications disestablished in 1872
1872 establishments in the Cape Colony
1873 disestablishments in the Cape Colony